Neşet Suyu Nature Park, aka Neşetsuyu Nature Park, ( or Neşetsuyu Tabiat Parkı) is a nature park located in Sarıyer district of Istanbul Province, Turkey. 

It was established in 2011, and is one of the nine nature parks inside the Belgrad Forest. The protected area is named in honor of Professor Neşet Bey (1881–1924).

Neşet Bey was born in Resen, Ottoman Empire, today in North Macedonia, in 1881. He was much respected for his works in forestry by his colleagues and students. A memorial marble inscription erected by the Turkish Directorate General of Forestry on September 21, 1953 is situated inside the nature park.

In the southwest of the nature park, the Büyük Bent (literally: Big Dam) is situated on the Kırkçeşme water canal. Remains of a cistern and the mihrab of an open-air prayer place are registered protected cultural heritage in the park area.

In 2000, the soil in the park area, which is one of the most popular recreation places in Istanbul, was loosened up by earth movers since the soil became hardened  throughout the years like concrete endangering the trees. It was found that the growth of the tree roots stopped, bacteria and fungi population increased due to lack of oxygen in the soil. Fallen leaves could not merge with the hardened soil to make it nutrient for the vegetation. The park area was closed to picnics until 2005.

Ecosystem
The nature park has rich flora and fauna.

Flora
Dominant tree species of the nature park are oak and European hornbeam (Carpinus betulus). Other vegetation in the area are various shrubs and bushes.

Fauna
There are mammals and bird species in significant numbers in the Belgrad Forest. The main fauna species of the forestry are wild boar, golden jackal, deer, roe, fox, wolf, weasel, hare, squirrel, tortoise and hedgehog. As bird species observed are falcon, hawk, magpie, crow, woodpecker, sparrow, finch and goldfinch.

Gallery

See also
 Ayvat Bendi Nature Park
 Bentler Nature Park
 Falih Rıfkı Atay Nature Park
 Fatih Çeşmesi Nature Park
 Irmak Nature Park
 Kirazlıbent Nature Park
 Kömürcübent Nature Park
 Mehmet Akif Ersoy Nature Park

References

Nature parks in Turkey
Protected areas established in 2011
2011 establishments in Turkey
Parks in Istanbul
Sarıyer
Belgrad Forest